Heinz Faßmann (born 13 August 1955 in Düsseldorf) is an Austrian politician and professor of human geography and land-use planning at the University of Vienna. He served as the Minister of Education in the Second Kurz cabinet in the government of Chancellor Sebastian Kurz and the Schallenberg government of Chancellor Alexander Schallenberg. He previously served in the same capacity from December 2017 to June 2019: he was succeeded in the post by Martin Polaschek in December 2021. Faßmann is considered to be aligned with the Austrian People's Party (ÖVP) but holds no formal party membership or affiliation.

In 2022, he became the new president of the Austrian Academy of Sciences.

Early life 
Heinz Faßmann was born on 13 August 1955 in Düsseldorf, Germany.

He spent his childhood and adolescence in Vienna.

Faßmann attended primary school from 1962 to 1966 and grammar school from 1966 to 1974.

Career 
Faßmann studied geography and social and economic history at the University of Vienna, graduating with a PhD in 1980.
From 1980 to 1981, he was engaged in postgraduate work in sociology at the Institute for Advanced Studies.

From 1981 to 1992, Faßmann was a researcher with the Austrian Academy of Sciences. He spent his academy years on the academy's commission on land-use planning. On the strength of his commission work, he was appointed director of the Institute of City and Regional Planning in 1992.

Four years later, in 1996, Faßmann left Vienna and the academy to become a C4 professor of human geography and geoinformatics at the Technical University of Munich.
Another four years later, in 2000, Faßmann returned to Vienna to teach human geography and land-use planning at his alma mater. In 2011, he was made the university's vice rector, a post he held until his transition into politics in 2017.
He also served as a member of the senate of the University of Vienna from 2000 to 2006 and as the dean of the Faculty of Geosciences from 2006 to 2011.

In addition to his academic work, Faßmann held positions on various committees and sat on the supervisory boards of a number of companies, including one university spin-off incubator.
Faßmann ran a spin-off of his own, the Heinz Faßmann Projektentwicklung KG, from 2013 to 2018.
He was director of the Expert Commission of German Foundations on Integration and Migration from 2009 to 2017.
In 2006 he was, for the second time, appointed Director of the Institute of City and Regional Planning.

Faßmann routinely acted as a political consultant and advisor to the Austrian government. He became chairman of the Ministry of Europe, Integration and Foreign Affairs Expert Commission on Integration in 2010.
He has been sitting on the Ministry of the Interior Migration Council for Austria,
later renamed Migration Commission,
since 2014.

Although Faßmann had never held elected office and never officially attached himself to any political party, he was invited to join the Kurz cabinet as the minister of education.
When the cabinet took office on 18 December 2017, Faßmann was appointed minister of education and science. Following a reshuffling of ministerial responsibilities − a move regularly made by new parliamentary majority leaders − he became minister of education, science and research on 8 January 2018.
While in government Faßmann resigned his positions as a vice rector, as the chairman of the commission, and as a member of the council. For the duration of his term in cabinet office, he also suspended his position as the director of the Institute of City and Regional Planning.

He was succeeded by another OVP-nominated academic, Martin Polaschek, in the Nehammer Government in December 2021. In 2022, he became the new president of the Austrian Academy of Sciences.

Other activities
 National Fund of the Republic of Austria for Victims of National Socialism, Member of the Board of Trustees (since 2020)

Personal life 
Born a German, Heinz Faßmann has been a naturalized Austrian citizen since 1994.

He is married and has two children.

Faßmann stands well over two meters tall. Correcting media reports that erroneously cited even greater numbers, Faßmann states his height at 203 cm.

Selected publications

References

External links 

 Dr. Heinz Faßmann − Parliament homepage 
 Der Bundesminister: Univ.-Prof. Dr. Heinz Faßmann − Ministry homepage
 Univ.-Prof. Dr. Heinz Faßmann − Faßmann CV on Meine Abgeordneten

1955 births
Living people
Government ministers of Austria
University of Vienna alumni
Human geographers
Austrian sociologists
Austrian geographers
Members of Academia Europaea
Members of the Austrian Academy of Sciences
Academic staff of the University of Vienna
Academic staff of the Technical University of Munich
Education ministers
Science ministers
21st-century Austrian politicians